Khabalyovo is a rural locality (a village) in Kupriyanovskoye Rural Settlement, Gorokhovetsky District, Vladimir Oblast, Russia. The population was 13 as of 2010.

Geography 
Khabalyovo is located on the Klyazma River, 14 km west of Gorokhovets (the district's administrative centre) by road. Shuklino is the nearest rural locality.

References 

Rural localities in Gorokhovetsky District